Socialist Alternative is a socialist group in Turkey which campaigns for a party of the working class to express the political needs of those not benefiting from the capitalist system. They believe a strong and organized movement of workers and young people to overthrow capitalism can establish a new society which can heal racial and sectarian divides and protect the environment. This can be achieved by taking banks and big business into public ownership and administering them through democratic control and management.  It was affiliated with International Socialist Alternative, a Trotskyist international, until 24 June 2021.

Political views

International revolution
While Socialist Alternative supports reforms that improve the living standards of working people, it opposes a strictly reformist attitude to social change.  It believes the working class is lacking a leadership with the foresight to challenge the capitalist system itself – the real source of all the underlying problems. As Capitalism is an international system the opposition to it must be organised internationally and to that end they are affiliated to the committee for a workers international.

Democratic socialism
Socialist Alternative advocates socialist democracy as an alternative to both the degenerated workers' state of the former Soviet Union and the capitalist democratic model which it considers designed only to benefit the ruling class and disenfranchise working people.  It argues that capitalism allows a small minority of wealthy elites at the top to manipulate the political system in their favour while working people are left out of any serious decision-making process, whether at work or in government. A socialist society, it maintains, would reverse this relationship with working people running the economy, utilising the enormous wealth and productivity of society to enrich their own lives.

It does not consider the former Soviet Union socialist, but rather a "tragic degeneration" of the Russian Revolution and the socialist tradition. While it views the Russian Revolution positively as a mass democratic revolution of the working class in Russia, it is in complete opposition to the bureaucratic dictatorship that came about after the death of Vladimir Lenin and Joseph Stalin's subsequent reign of terror.  It sees these not as an inevitable outcome of the Russian Revolution, but an expression of Russia's isolation and economic starvation and a result of the vacuum of workers' power from below. "This was not a healthy ground upon which socialism could be built. The whole basis of socialism is having enough to go around, but Russia didn't have that. In this context, the democratic structures in the Soviets (workers' assemblies) ceased to function.

Kurdistan

Socialist Alternative commented that "As a result of the conflict a deep division has developed between the Turkish and the Kurdish working class which has been a barrier to any joint struggle against exploitation.".
There is no doubt that in both northern Iraq, and in and around Rojava, the self-sacrifice and guerilla experience of many fighters from the PKK and PYD have played an important role in keeping IS in check.
It has called for the defence of Kobane through the self organisation of the people of

Women's oppression
Socialist Alternative has been critical of government attempts to increase Islamic influence on schools and allowing the withdrawal of girls from middle school for home education which it believes would lead to greater gender inequality. While arguing for and fighting for every reform possible socialists seek to link the fight for women's liberation to the fight for socialism – a system that is based on real equality and economic justice.

A new party for workers
Socialist Alternative stands for the unity of the working class and is broadly supportive of the Peoples' Democratic Congress (HDK), which is currently the strongest initiative to unite the Turkish and Kurdish left. A real and lasting solution for peaceful coexistence and cooperation in the region has to be based on the end of all oppression, full democratic rights and a planned development of the economies of the region to guarantee jobs, decent housing, access to water and electricity, free non-religious education and a free health system for all. Full democratic rights for Kurds. as well as full rights for all workers, including full rights for trade unions can only be achieved by the struggle from below. However they are not completely uncritical of HDK and have said that defending the bosses is not the way to build a mass party of the working class.

References

Far-left politics in Turkey
Organizations with year of establishment missing
Trotskyist organizations in Turkey